

History 
Today Pavlodar Regional Universal Academic Library named after S. Toraigyrov is the main library of the region, appears to be the key book repository, a depository of local history documents. The district library coordinates the activity of libraries of all departments, realizes the methodical and information and bibliographic support of the population of the region.

The beginning of the regional library area takes place in 1892, when, after the conclusion of the municipal Duma and on donations from the merchant Derov Artemy Ivanovich and other patrons of the city opened the doors of the "city public library with a gratuitous reading room, which fits in a private home. The fund's representatives gathered at charity evenings to raise funds for the library's maintenance.

By 1896 it had acquired the name of a county library. Subsequently, this date was considered the year the library was founded.  At that time the resource of the library at that time accrued 5475 copies of books and magazines. The next moment in the history of Pavlodar district library began in 1920, after the adoption of the decree "On the centralization of library circumstances in the RSFSR". The library was transferred to budget funding, which allowed it to increase its resource and complete 10 mobile libraries throughout the region with a fund of 3,500 copies.

Since 1929 the county library became a district library, and since 1932 - a district one. In 1938, after the formation of Pavlodar region, the library received the status of the regional library.

In 1951, the regional library became the user of the Lenin library. Lenin and earned after the IBA of 11 books. For the first time was designed the order of offering methodical support to regional and city libraries, held a seminar in the city, departmental, school and party libraries KSSR.

In 1988, by the order of the Ministry of culture of Kazakh SSR, Pavlodar regional - the universal, youth and children's libraries were the first in the republic, which were united and became the largest in the region - the Regional Universal Scientific Library. Until 1996 the regional library had 5 rooms, scattered around the city, there were not enough places for a single reading room, the books were stored in the book depository, which made the work of the library very difficult.  Later, during the celebration of the 100th anniversary, the library was moved to the site of today's building located at the corner of the intersection of Satpayev and Kairbayev streets, near the akimat of Pavlodar.

From 1959 to 1996 the library was named after the famous Soviet writer Nikolay Ostrovsky. In 1996 the regional library was named after the outstanding Kazakh poet Sultanmakhmut Toraigyrov.

From 1937 to 2015 the district and then regional library was headed by: Baidildin T., Vetrova V. P., Ivanova I., Kovalenko A. A., Ryzhko E. V., Fatfullina M. O., Baidildin, Burilov I., Eisenberg I. I., Kirisova S. F., Shamanina L. Z., Lyamzina L. S., Grezina L. M., Jienbaeva M. A. Since 2015 to the present day the library has been headed by Shakhmetova Sh. B.

References 

Libraries in Kazakhstan
Libraries established in 1892